Gleick is a surname. Notable people with the surname include:

James Gleick (born 1954), American author, journalist, and biographer
Peter Gleick (born 1956), American scientist

See also
Glick